Ti is the Chinese word for substance or body. The philosopher Zhang Zai described the ti as "that which is never absent, that is, through all transformations." 

In Neo-Confucianism, this concept is often associated with yong, which means "use" or "function." Such function or how the yong of a thing is its activity or its response when stimulated underscores the link. Like the concepts of nei-wai (inner-outer) and ben-mo (root-branch), ti-yong is central to Chinese metaphysics.  The link was adopted in order to manifest the actual meaning of the two truths and the relationship between them.

References

Concepts in Chinese philosophy